The Women's Asian Champions Trophy is a biennial women's international field hockey competition contested by the best five women's national teams of the member associations of the Asian Hockey Federation.

The tournament has been won by three different teams. South Korea are the defending champions and have to most titles with three. Japan has two titles and India has won the tournament once. The tournament was expanded to six teams in 2021.

Results

Top four statistics

* = host nation

Team appearances

See also
Men's Asian Champions Trophy
Women's Hockey Asia Cup

References

External links
Asian Hockey Federation

 
Champions Trophy
Asian Champions Trophy